Nawab Jaafar Ali Khan Bahadur was son of Nawab Husain Ali Khan Bahadur. Although he did not rule in Masulipatam, he was given the title Nawab of Masulipatam and Khan Bahadur.

He married Husaini Begum Sahiba, daughter of his paternal uncle, Reza Ali Khan II (son of Nawab Husain Ali Khan Bahadur).

According to some sources, the two surviving grand children of Reza Ali Khan II are Nawab Riasat Ali Mirza who lives in chennai and Nawab Shujaath Ali Mirza who lives in the city of Hyderabad.

See also
Nawab of Carnatic
Nawab of Banganapalle

Nawabs of India